Marcus Dahlin (born 29 May 1991) is a Swedish handball player, who plays for SønderjyskE Håndbold.

References

1991 births
Living people
Swedish male handball players
Sportspeople from Västra Götaland County
21st-century Swedish people